Dr. Jovan Tošković (1893, in Plana, Kolašin, Principality of Montenegro – 21 October 1943, Ostrog monastery, Italian governorate of Montenegro) was a Montenegrin Serb historian, professor and politician. 

Born to a merchant family in Plana, Principality of Montenegro, Jovan finished his primary education in the town of Kolašin and later moved to Belgrade under the guidance of his uncle, an envoy of King Nikola. He graduated from the University of Belgrade's newly created Faculty of Philosophy, and having published his doctoral thesis he became the first post-war professor of Serbian history at the university. The fact that he earned his doctorate from the University of Belgrade in 1920 also makes him the first professor of history to have graduated from a Serbian university (as all senior professors earned their doctorates from foreign universities - notably from those of Vienna, Prague and Saint-Petersburg).

Having been a staunch supporter of the Yugoslav monarchy, he joined the Chetnik movement in 1941 and subsequently relocated to Montenegro. There, he served as an advisor to Blažo Đukanović and worked within the various ministries of the Italian governorate of Montenegro with the hope of establishing a foothold for the monarchist forces in the region. On October 19, 1943, he was captured and shot by the Yugoslav Partisans at the Chetnik headquarters in the Ostrog Monastery.

External links
 
 
 

1890s births
1943 deaths
People from Kolašin
People of the Principality of Montenegro
Montenegrin Chetnik personnel of World War II
Executed Montenegrin people
Serbian people of World War II
Executed Serbian people
University of Belgrade Faculty of Philosophy alumni
Chetnik personnel of World War II
20th-century executions
People killed by Yugoslav Partisans
Executed Yugoslav collaborators with Nazi Germany